John Cassidy is a professional comedian, magician, and balloon artist who holds several Guinness World Record speed records for balloon sculpting. In November 2007, Cassidy inflated and sculpted a record 747 balloons in one hour. He secured another record when he created thirteen balloon sculptures within one minute.

John has appeared numerous times on television as either a stand-up comedian, magician or as a Guinness Book of Records celebrity. He has been a guest on Late Night with Conan O'Brien, Martha Stewart Living, The Weakest Link, NBC's Today Show, Live With Regis and Kelly, and the Jerry Lewis MDA Telethon four years in a row. He has also been featured in numerous periodicals including Better Homes and Gardens and The Philadelphia Inquirer, and he has performed at The White House, The Magic Castle, Foxwoods Casino, the Golden Nugget Las Vegas, the Flamingo Las Vegas and The Comedy and Magic Club in Hermosa Beach, CA.

The more unusual staples of his stage show include a lawn dart cannon, a "telekinetic" cymbal-banging monkey toy, and a six-foot red balloon that John climbs into to complete a magic trick.

Cassidy and his wife Jennifer are lifelong residents of the greater Philadelphia metropolitan area but regularly tour and perform dates nationwide.

Sources

External links
 John Cassidy: Magic & Balloons
  My Space

American male comedians
21st-century American comedians
American magicians
1967 births
Living people
Balloon artists